Cookstown is a town and townland in County Tyrone, Northern Ireland.

Cookstown may also refer to:
Cookstown, Ontario, Canada
Cookstown, Tallaght, Dublin, Ireland 
Cookstown, New Jersey, United States

See also
Cooktown (disambiguation)